The 1963 UC Santa Barbara Gauchos football team represented University of California, Santa Barbara (UCSB) during the 1963 NCAA College Division football season.

UCSB competed as an Independent in 1963, after having been a member of the California Collegiate Athletic Association (CCAA) for the previous 24 years. The team was led by first-year head coach "Cactus Jack" Curtice, and played home games at La Playa Stadium in Santa Barbara, California. They finished the season with a record of four wins and five losses (4–5).

Schedule

Notes

References

UC Santa Barbara
UC Santa Barbara Gauchos football seasons
UC Santa Barbara Gauchos football